Suchonosaurus is an extinct genus of procolophonid reptile from the Late Permian of Russia. It is monotypic, including the species Suchonosaurus minimus, which is itself known only from a single fragment of the upper jaw. Suchonosaurus is currently considered the oldest member of the family Procolophonidae, as it is the only procolophonid known from the Permian period.

References

Procolophonids
Permian reptiles
Fossils of Russia
Prehistoric reptile genera